This was the first edition of the event.

Jan-Lennard Struff won the title, defeating Márton Fucsovics in the final, 6–2, 7–6(7–5).

Seeds

  Jan-Lennard Struff (champion)
  Dustin Brown (first round)
  Michael Russell (second round)
  Andrey Kuznetsov (quarterfinals)
  Andreas Haider-Maurer (second round)
  Julian Reister (withdrew because of back injury)
  Blaž Kavčič (quarterfinals)
  Frank Dancevic (first round)
  Marsel İlhan (quarterfinals)

Draw

Finals

Top half

Bottom half

References
 Main Draw
 Qualifying Draw

Heilbronner Neckarcupandnbsp;- Singles
2014 Singles